Cymbopteryx is a genus of moths of the family Crambidae.

Species
Cymbopteryx diffusa Munroe, 1974
Cymbopteryx extralinea (Dyar in Dyar, 1914)
Cymbopteryx fuscimarginalis Munroe, 1961
Cymbopteryx pseudobelialis Munroe, 1974
Cymbopteryx unilinealis (Barnes & McDunnough, 1918)

References

Odontiini
Crambidae genera
Taxa named by Eugene G. Munroe